Peter Shannel Agovaka (born 1 November 1959 in Bemuta Village, Guadalcanal Province) is a Solomon Islands politician.

He studied at Telecom College in Papua New Guinea, then at the North Sydney Institute of Engineering in Australia, before working as a Community Affairs Officer for Gold Ridge Mining Limited in Solomon Islands.

His career in national politics began when he was elected to Parliament as the member for Central Guadalcanal in the April 2006 general election. He was appointed Minister for Provincial Government and Constituency Development in Snyder Rini's government, but lost his Cabinet position when Rini resigned before a motion of no confidence in Parliament in May. In August, however, the new Prime Minister, Manasseh Sogavare, appointed him Minister for Commerce, Industries and Employment, a position he held until the Sogavare government was overthrown by a motion of no confidence in December 2007. Under Derek Sikua's ensuing premiership, Agovaka was, for a time, Leader of the Independent Members of Parliament, from January to September 2008.

In 2008, he was convicted and gaoled for nine months for assault and possession of an illegal weapon, and lost his seat in Parliament.

He resumed his seat in Parliament in the August 2010 general election, as a member of the newly formed Ownership, Unity and Responsibility Party, and was appointed Minister for Foreign Affairs and Trade Relations in Prime Minister Danny Philip's Cabinet. When Gordon Darcy Lilo replaced Philip as Prime Minister in November 2011, Agovaka retained his position in government. He was, however, sacked on 9 February 2012, after having, during a meeting with Russian Foreign Affairs Minister Sergei Lavrov in Fiji, "discussed the possibility of establishing diplomatic relations" between the two countries. Lilo wrote publicly to Shannel and told him he had breached "collective Cabinet responsibility": "As a developing country Solomon Islands should continue to strengthen our ties with traditional partners before pursuing new diplomatic groupings".

On 23 December 2014, following a general election, Agovaka was appointed Minister for Police by new Prime Minister Manasseh Sogavare.

Agovaka has also served on a number of parliamentary committees, and chaired the Constitution Review Committee from July 2009.

External links
 Peter Shanel Agovaka, as Minister for Foreign Affairs, presents Solomon Islands' national report to the United Nations Human Rights Council for the Universal Periodic Review, 4 May 2011 (videos)

References

1959 births
Living people
Members of the National Parliament of the Solomon Islands
People from Guadalcanal Province
Government ministers of the Solomon Islands
Association of Independent Members politicians
Ownership, Unity and Responsibility Party politicians
Foreign Ministers of the Solomon Islands